Vaccher is a surname. Notable people with the surname include:

 Andrea Vaccher (born 1988), Italian cyclist
 Ron Vaccher (1928–2001), Canadian football player

See also
 Vacchi